Beaconsfield Golf Club is a golf club, located in Seer Green, Buckinghamshire, England. It is located about 1 mile east of Beaconsfield. The club was established in 1902; in 1914, the club moved to a new course which was designed by Harry Colt.

References

Golf clubs and courses in Buckinghamshire
1913 establishments in England